Mathilde Angèle Delasalle (25 February 1867 – c. 1941) was a French artist known for her painting and etching. Her works are held in the collections of many museums.

Biography 
Delasalle first attended a convent school in Paris, the "Institution des Dames Augustines anglaises de Neuilly."  From 1880 to 1890 she studied at the private art school Académie Julian and studied with Jean-Joseph Benjamin-Constant, Jean-Paul Laurens and Jules Joseph Lefebvre.

Exhibits 
Delasalle's first exhibition took place in 1888 with a portrait of a lady at the Société des Artistes Français.

According to Women in the Fine Arts, B. Dufemex wrote about Delasalle in the Magazine of Arts, June 1902.This artist came into notice in 1895 by means of her picture of Cain and Enoch's Daughters. Since then her annual contributions have demonstrated her gradual acquirement of unquestionable mastery of her art. Her characteristic energy is such that her sex cannot be detected in her work; in fact, she was made the first and only woman member of the International Association of Painters under the impression that her pictures — signed simply A. Delasalle — were the work of a man.In 1899 a state travel scholarship allowed her to paint in Italy, the Netherlands and England, where "she absorbed the influences of Rembrandt and Turner." In the 1890s Delasalle expanded her subject matter from portraits to female nudes and she started showing her etchings in about 1904.

She also became known for her rendering of landscapes such as Views from Greenwich Park and images of animals, in addition to scenes from the work world and portraits of other artists of her time such as Pierre Prins (1907). Her works were exhibited in Paris, Liège  and Munich. Her studio was located at 3 rue Jean Baptiste Dumas in the 17th arrondisment of Paris. 
Delasalle was a member of the “Societé Internationale de Peinture et Sculpture” and a founding member of the Société du Salon d'Automne. She received several exhibition medals, including one in 1897 for Return from the Hunt (Salon des Artistes Français) and a silver medal at the 1900 worlds fair, better known as the Paris Exposition. The travel grant was awarded to her by the “Conseil Supérieur des Beaux-Arts."

In 1926 Delasalle was made a Chevalier of the Légion d'Honneur.

Her work was also featured in a 2003 exhibition in Bordeaux that traced the "emergence of prehistory as a scientific discipline and source of artistic inspiration," Musée d'Aquitaine.

Death 
The date of Delasalle's death is in dispute with sources saying, "after 1938," 26 August 1939 or 1941. According to Graves,Benezit simply says it was post-1938; a number of other sources give 1939; the Departement des Arts Graphiques of the Louvre gives it as around 1941; Joconde, the catalogue of the collections of French museums prepared by the French ministry of culture, gives the date firmly as 1941.

Gallery

Selected works 
Delasalle's work was widely exhibited and awarded during her lifetime.

Paintings
 1895: Cain and the daughters of Enoch
 1897: Diana in repose
 1898: Coming home from the hunt (Poitiers Town Hall, awarded a medal) (Exhibited in the Paris Salon in 1898)
 1899: The Earthworker (Petit Palais) 
 1899: An Evening in Saint-Cloud (G. Petit Gallery in Paris)
 1900: The forge (Museum in Rouen)
 1901: The horse pond at Pont Saint-Cloud (Museum in Nantes)
 1901 and 1902: Portraits of Benjamin Constant (Musée du Luxembourg and Kunsthalle Bremen)
 1902: The roofer
 1905: Portrait of the painter Jules Adler
 1910: Woman at the toilet
 1911: Girls bathing
 1912: The Duke of Montpensier on the tiger hunt

Etchings
 1904: The forge
 1908: Portrait of a young man
 1909: Apse of Saint-Germain-L'Auxerrois 
 1909: Reclining female nude
 1910: Allée de Meudon

References

External links 
 Inventory of certain museum-held works by Delasalle

1867 births
1939 deaths
Painters from Paris
20th-century French painters
French women painters
Académie Julian alumni
19th-century French women artists
20th-century French women artists
Chevaliers of the Légion d'honneur